In enzymology, a N-feruloylglycine deacylase is an enzyme that catalyzes the chemical reaction

N-feruloylglycine + H2O  ferulate + glycine

Thus, the two substrates of this enzyme are N-feruloylglycine and H2O, whereas its two products are ferulate and glycine.

This enzyme belongs to the family of hydrolases, those acting on carbon-nitrogen bonds other than peptide bonds, specifically in linear amides.  The systematic name of this enzyme class is N-feruloylglycine amidohydrolase. This enzyme is also called N-feruloylglycine hydrolase.

References

 
 

EC 3.5.1
Enzymes of unknown structure